Peter Palese is a United States microbiologist and professor and chair of the Department of Microbiology at the Icahn School of Medicine at Mount Sinai in New York City, and an expert in the field of RNA viruses.

Palese built "the first genetic maps for influenza A, B and C viruses, identified the function of several viral genes, ...defined the mechanism of neuraminidase inhibitors (which are now FDA-approved antivirals)" and "pioneered the field of reverse genetics for negative-strand RNA viruses". Furtherance of this technique has been used by Palese and his colleagues in reconstructing and studying the pathogenicity of the extinct but deadly  1918 pandemic influenza virus. Reverse genetics also assist in the development of new flu vaccines.

Palese is the author of multiple book chapters and more than 400 scientific publications. He is on the editorial board for Proceedings of the National Academy of Sciences of the United States of America (PNAS). He has been awarded multiple patents on viral vaccines and antivirals.

Biography

His primary schooling consisted of Greek and Latin, and very little modern science. He developed his interest in science later, at the University of Vienna, where he received his Ph.D. in chemistry in 1969 and his M.S. in pharmacy in 1970. He was a postdoctoral fellow at the Roche Institute of Molecular Biology from 1970 until 1971, when he joined the Department of Microbiology at the Icahn School of Medicine at Mount Sinai as assistant professor. In 1976 he was visiting associate professor, Department of Microbiology and Immunology at the University of California, Los Angeles School of Medicine. In 1987 he was named chairman of the Department of Microbiology of the Icahn School of Medicine at Mount Sinai.

When cells are infected by viruses, they respond with antiviral interferons. Palese and Adolfo García-Sastre showed that most negative-strand RNA viruses counteract that antiviral response with protein antagonists to interferons. His work on "fundamental questions concerning the genetic make-up and biology of viruses" and virus-host interactions "uses molecular biological techniques to understand how viruses replicate and how they interact with cells to cause disease in their hosts", with emphasis on "the study of RNA viruses, including influenza, paramyxo and corona (SARS) viruses". He developed a new animal model (the guinea pig) for studying the transmission of influenza viruses.

Honors and awards
Palese is a member of the National Academy of Sciences (2000), the Institute of Medicine (IOM) (2012), the Austrian Academy of Sciences (2002) and the German Academy of Sciences Leopoldina (2006). He has served the presidencies of the Harvey Society from 2003 to 2004 and the American Society of Virology from 2005 to 2006. In 2014, he was elected Fellow of the American Academy of Arts and Sciences. He has  received an honorary doctorate from both Baylor College of Medicine (2014) and McMaster University (2016).  
Robert Koch Prize (2006).
Charles C. Shepard Science Award (2006 and 2008).
Wilhelm Exner Medal (2007).
European Virology Award (EVA) (2010).
Sanofi – Institut Pasteur Award (2012).
Beijerinck Virology Prize from the Royal Netherlands Academy of Arts and Sciences (2015).
Maurice Hilleman/Merck Award from American Society for Microbiology (2016).

Publications
Partial List:

References

External links
The Mount Sinai Hospital homepage
The Mount Sinai School of Medicine homepage
The Palese Laboratory at the Mount Sinai Medical Center
Swine flu discussion with Dr. Peter Palese on Give and Take with Julie Menin
A roundtable discussion about the avian flu. Laurie Garrett, Harvey V. Fineberg, Peter Palese and Paul Nurse on Charlie Rose, March 22, 2008.
Swine Flu: H1N1 Interview with Dr. Peter Palese on 60 Minutes
TWiV 396: Influenza viruses with Peter Palese, July 3, 2016. Interview with Vincent Racaniello on his career in virology, from early work on neuraminidases to universal influenza virus vaccines.

American virologists
Influenza researchers
Living people
Members of the United States National Academy of Sciences
Icahn School of Medicine at Mount Sinai faculty
University of Vienna alumni
Recipients of the Austrian Decoration for Science and Art
1944 births
American microbiologists
Members of the National Academy of Medicine